Coming into the Country is a 1976 book by John McPhee about Alaska and McPhee's travels through much of the state with bush pilots, prospectors, and settlers, as well as politicians and businesspeople who each interpret the state in different ways.

One of his most widely read books, Coming into the Country is divided into three sections, "At the Northern Tree Line: The Encircled River," "In Urban Alaska: What They Were Hunting For," and "In the Bush: Coming into the Country".

Like all of McPhee's books, Coming into the Country started out as an outline that he proceeded to fill in. It is McPhee's best selling book.

After the publication of Coming into the Country, The New York Times called McPhee "the most versatile journalist in America".

See also
 Going to Extremes, a book by Joe McGinniss which covers much of the same subject matter and time frame

References

External links
 Coming into the Country at the http://us.macmillan.com web site

1976 non-fiction books
Books about Alaska
Books by John McPhee
American travel books